was a Japanese-born nature photographer. He originally hailed from Ichikawa, Chiba Prefecture.  Considered one of the most accomplished nature photographers of his era and compared to Ansel Adams, Hoshino specialized in photographing Alaskan wildlife until he was killed by a brown bear while on assignment in Kurilskoye Lake, Russia in 1996. Lynn Schooler's book The Blue Bear relates the story of the author's friendship with Hoshino, a man he admired greatly for his skill as a photographer and his humanity. Schooler is a wilderness guide who became a photographer in his own right under Hoshino's tutelage. Another book, The Only Kayak by Kim Heacox, describes Hoshino's journeys to Glacier Bay as well as his own close personal friendship with Hoshino.

A memorial totem pole was raised in Sitka, Alaska, on August 8, 2008 (the 12-year anniversary of Hoshino's death), in honor of his work. Relatives and witnesses from Japan, including his widow, Naoko, attended the ceremony. Hoshino's wife and son survive him.

Life 

Michio's interest in Alaska began at the age of 19, when he bought a photo book showing the village of Shishmaref. Wanting to see it for himself, he sent a letter to the village's mayor, who replied six months later inviting him to visit. The following summer, he spent three months there, taking photographs and helping to catch fish.

Hoshino's photographs 

Grizzly. San Francisco: Chronicle, 1987. .
The Grizzly Bear Family Book. North-South Books, 1997. . For young readers.
Hoshino's Alaska. San Francisco: Chronicle, 2007. .
Moose. San Francisco: Chronicle, 1988. Hardback . Paperback .

Death 

Hoshino died after being mauled by a brown bear in Kurile Lake on the Kamchatka Peninsula in eastern Russia in August 1996.

Last photo hoax 

A photo of a bear entering a tent circulating the internet has been identified as the last photo that Michio Hoshino took before he got mauled to death by said bear is incorrect. The photo was entered into the Worth1000 photoshop competition, in which the theme was "hoax last photo taken before death".

Further reading 

 Schooler, Lynn. The Blue Bear. New York: Harper Collins, 2002. . New York: Ecco, 2002. .
 Heacox, Kim.  The Only Kayak. Giulford, CT:  The Lyons Press, 2005.

References

External links 

  Hoshino's site
  J'Lit | Authors : Michio Hoshino | Books from Japan
 Coming Home: The Photographs of Michio Hoshino
 Michio Hoshino Photo Gallery - by AnimalsandEarth

Interviews 

 Interview with Lynn Schooler about The Blue Bear
 Gaia Symphony Documentary series (Japanese production).

Japanese photographers
Nature photographers
1952 births
1996 deaths
People from Ichikawa, Chiba
Deaths due to bear attacks
Accidental deaths in Russia
Photography forgeries